Neosybra meridionalis is a species of beetle in the family Cerambycidae. It was described by Hunt and Breuning in 1957.

References

Neosybra
Beetles described in 1957